No Pay, Nudity is a 2016 American comedy drama film starring Gabriel Byrne.

Cast
Gabriel Byrne as Lawrence Rose
Frances Conroy as Andrea
Donna Murphy as Pearl
Nathan Lane as Herschel
Valerie Mahaffey as Lisa
J. Smith-Cameron as Debra
Ellen Foley as Tani Marshall
Ethan Sandler as Atash
Boyd Gaines as Stephan
Zoe Perry daughter

Reception
The film has a 71% rating on Rotten Tomatoes.

References

External links
 
 

American comedy-drama films
2016 films
2016 comedy-drama films
2010s English-language films
2010s American films